Borne is a railway station located in Borne, Netherlands. The station was opened on 18 October 1865 and is located on the Almelo–Salzbergen railway line.

Train services

Bus services

External links
NS website 
Dutch Public Transport journey planner 

Railway stations in Overijssel
Railway stations in Germany opened in 1865
Railway stations on the Almelo - Salzbergen railway line
Borne, Overijssel